Cela is a freguesia (civil parish) in the municipality of Alcobaça, Portugal. The population in 2011 was 3,264, in an area of 25.83 km². It received town status in 1999.

Climate

References

Towns in Portugal
Freguesias of Alcobaça, Portugal